List of Asian television stations is a list of television stations which are notable in Asia. Notability refers to them being the dominant stations within their region/countries in terms of viewers.

See also

Television system
Television antenna
Television station
Television network
Television channel
Multichannel television
Television channel frequencies
Asian television frequencies
Pay television
Television receive-only
Broadcast television systems
Terrestrial television
Satellite television
Channel drift
List of television networks by country

References

Asian
Television Stations